The Cat in the Hat (also known as Dr. Seuss' The Cat in the Hat) is a 2003 2.5D platform game for PlayStation 2, Xbox, Microsoft Windows and Game Boy Advance. The PlayStation 2 and Xbox versions were developed by Magenta Software. The Windows and Game Boy Advance versions were developed by Digital Eclipse. All versions of the game were published by Vivendi Universal Games. It is based on the 2003 film of the same name, which was released shortly after the game. A version for the GameCube was planned, but was never released. The Windows version is compatible with Windows 98, Windows ME, Windows 2000, Windows XP, Windows Vista, and Windows 7. It is not compatible with Windows 95 or earlier versions of Windows or Windows 8 and later versions of Windows.

Plot 
On a stormy day, Conrad (Chase Chavarria) and Sally (Andrea Bowen) are confined inside their house while their mother is gone. The Cat in the Hat (Chris Edgerly) arrives to bring them cheer, but their next-door neighbor, Larry Quinn (Fred Tatasciore), steals the Crab Lock that seals the Cat's magical crate, causing magic to flood the house and unleash chaos that threatens the world. The Cat makes his way through different stages—household objects or rooms which have been corrupted by the magic—with the guidance of the family's fish (Nolan North), recaptures the magic, and chases Larry Quinn, who is after the magic in a quest to become immensely powerful. After cleaning the house of magic and besting Larry Quinn, the Crab Lock reattaches to the crate, sealing away the magic.

The plot of the Game Boy Advance version is largely the same, with the exception that Conrad removes the lock, as Larry Quinn is not present.

Gameplay

PlayStation 2, Xbox, and Windows 

The main objective of the game is to explore worlds and chase Quinn out of them while gathering the scattered magic. There are ten levels and three boss fights (two in the PC version), though there is also a bonus level which can be unlocked by completing the bonus stages in each level. To traverse these levels, the cat can jump, glide with his umbrella, zipline, slam the ground with his umbrella and collect enemies and explosive goo in bubbles for use as projectiles, among other maneuvers.

The hub world in this game is Conrad and Sally's House. However, when the player starts a new game, they will only have access to the Living Room, as Conrad and Sally will prevent the Cat from going upstairs and into the Kitchen and Garage, respectively. As the player clears the levels, Conrad and Sally will allow the Cat access to those areas. 

There are ten levels and three boss fights (two in the PC version). There is also a bonus level which can be unlocked by completing the bonus stages in each level. In each level, the Cat must make it to the end to chase out Quinn while collecting the scattered magic. To traverse these levels, the cat can jump, glide with his umbrella, zipline, slam the ground with his umbrella and collect enemies and explosive goo in bubbles for use as projectiles, among other maneuvers.

The game utilizes a health meter which is a cake consisting of four slices and a cherry on top, with each slice and the cherry representing a hit point. If the Cat collides with an enemy or obstacle, a slice or the cherry is removed from the health meter. When all slices and the cherry are gone, the Cat loses a life. If the Cat loses all of their lives, the game ends. If this happens, the player can restart the current level from the beginning or return to the title screen and restart from their last save point.

The game has a variety of collectibles. Each level contains small clusters of magic whose value varies by color; if every cluster is collected within a stage, the stage's appearance in the hub world returns to normal. Collecting all of the magic in the game will allow the player to view the game's true ending where the crate is sealed. In addition to the magic, there are slices of cake that restore the Cat's health and clapperboards that unlock clips from the movie for viewing in the menu when collected. Each stage contains 4 keys which are stolen by Thing One and Thing Two. Collecting all 4 keys unlocks the bonus door at the end of the level. The bonus door at the end of each stage leads to a short segment of gameplay where the player must outrun hazards such as rolling objects, rising liquids, and laser beams to collect some additional magic and a bonus crystal at the end. The bonus stages are inaccessible in the PC version of the game due to the hardware limitations of the computers at the time the game was released. When the player opens the bonus doors in this version, they just simply get the magic and gems instead. When a player collects a gem in a level, it will be inserted in one of the slots on the edge of the mirror near the Grandfather Clock level in the hub world. When all the gems are collected, a bonus stage called Mystical Mirror is unlocked.

Each level in the game has checkpoints, which are either tunnels or checkpoint cameras. If the Cat passes one of these and then loses a life, he will restart from the last one he passed.

In the game's boss fights, the Cat fights Quinn's machine, which is powered by the Crab Lock, and must fire bubbles full of enemies into the machine's exhaust pipe to damage it. After the Cat damages the pipe enough times, he will obtain a portion of the Crab Lock needed to seal his crate. In the Xbox and PS2 versions of the game, the Cat must hit the piece of the Crab Lock with explosive goo to obtain it. If the player revisits one of these stages after completing it, Thing One and Thing Two will pilot the machine instead of Quinn.

Game Boy Advance 
In addition to platforming stages, the Game Boy Advance version contains four stages where the player scuba dives to obtain pieces of the Crab Lock. There's also a bonus stage where the Cat drives his cleaning machine to catch Thing One and Thing Two. Collectibles include icons related to the theme of the stage as well as enemies that have been defeated.

Reception 

The Cat in the Hat received mixed reviews, except for the PC and Game Boy Advance versions, which received unfavorable reviews.

Windows 
GameZone gave the Windows version an overall score of 8/10, praising the gameplay as fun and easy, the graphics as "bright and vivid", and the soundtrack as "catchy", saying the presentation "captures the essence of Seuss" better than the movie. However, they criticized levels as "tend[ing] to be very similar to each other", the backgrounds as "pixelated", and the content as ordinary.

Computer and Video Games gave the game a 3.0/10 and called it "a shameless cash-in", "just trash", "a big pile of sh...", and "fit for the litter tray".

PC Gamer UK gave it a 9%, calling it "steaming effluent" and the worst platform game they played. They criticized the Cat's performance as "annoying", cited bugs they experienced with the game such as collision issues, complained of poor level design, and called the graphics "drab" and outdated.

Game Boy Advance 
GameSpot gave the Game Boy Advance version a 3.8/10, calling games like it "the reason why licensed games have such a bad reputation". They said the game "isn't any fun to play", calling the gameplay boring and unimaginative. They praised the graphics as "pleasing to the eye", but called the sound design lackluster. They concluded that Vivendi "missed a great opportunity" and called it "just a generic punch-and-run".

See also 
 List of video games based on films

Notes

References

External links
 Official website (defunct)
 Dr. Seuss' The Cat in the Hat (PlayStation 2, Windows, Xbox) at MobyGames
 Dr. Seuss' The Cat in the Hat (Original Video Game Soundtrack) by Keith Leary
 Game manual for PlayStation 2 version
 Official trailer

2003 video games
Adaptations of works by Dr. Seuss
Game Boy Advance games
Platform games
PlayStation 2 games
Video games about cats
Video games based on films
Video games based on adaptations
Video games developed in the United Kingdom
Video games developed in the United States
Windows games
Xbox games
Cancelled GameCube games
Video games with 2.5D graphics
The Cat in the Hat
Single-player video games
Digital Eclipse games
Magenta Software games